The 1981 Missouri Valley Conference men's basketball tournament was played after the conclusion of the 1980–1981 regular season. The quarterfinal and semifinal rounds were played at campus sites, with the final contested at Levitt Arena on the campus of Wichita State University in Wichita, Kansas.

The Creighton defeated the Wichita State Shockers in the championship game, 70–64, and as a result won their 2nd MVC Tournament title and earned an automatic bid to the 1981 NCAA tournament.

Bracket

Note: * indicates host institution

References

1980–81 Missouri Valley Conference men's basketball season
Missouri Valley Conference men's basketball tournament
Missouri Valley Conference men's basketball tournament